Ceruchus chrysomelinus is a species of beetle belonging to the family Lucanidae.

It is native to Eurasia.

References

Lucanidae